Lemuel A. Davis (22 June 1914 – 16 January 1970), was an American jazz alto saxophonist associated with swing music. Born in Tampa, Florida, United States, his career began in the 1940s with pianist Nat Jaffe. Davis played with the Coleman Hawkins septet in 1943 and with Eddie Heywood's group. Throughout the 1940s, he played in a variety of jazz groups. In 1953, he appeared on Buck Clayton's "The Hucklebuck" recording. He continued to play in New York City throughout the 1950s, but recorded little thereafter.

Recordings
With Buck Clayton
The Huckle-Buck and Robbins' Nest (Columbia, 1954)
How Hi the Fi (Columbia, 1954)
Jumpin' at the Woodside (Columbia, 1955)
All the Cats Join In (Columbia 1956)

References

External links
 Biography of Lem Davis on AllMusic
 Works by Lem Davis on WorldCat

1914 births
1970 deaths
American jazz alto saxophonists
American male saxophonists
Swing saxophonists
20th-century American saxophonists
20th-century American male musicians
American male jazz musicians